Parastoo ("Parry") Hashemi (born 1980) is an Iranian-British neural engineer at Imperial College London and the University of South Carolina.

Hashemi's research develops and applies sensors for brain measurements of neurotransmitters in the context of mental illness etiology, diagnosis and treatment.

Life and academic career

Early life
Hashemi was born in Tehran, Iran and immigrated with her family to the United Kingdom, as a child, in 1986. She grew up in Durham, UK and attended Belmont Comprehensive school and Durham Johnston 6th Form College.

Hashemi graduated with a first class Master in Science (MSci) degree in chemistry from King's College London in 2003. She received her PhD in Bioengineering from Imperial College London in 2007 under the mentorship of Dr. Martyn Boutelle. The focus of her Ph.D. research was to develop online microdialysis techniques for monitoring humans with traumatic brain injury.

Hashemi moved to the United States in 2007 to perform her post-doctoral work with Dr. R. Mark Wightman at the University of North Carolina at Chapel Hill. The focus of her post-doctoral research was to develop a selective method for in vivo detection for brain serotonin.

Positions held
Hashemi held an assistant professorship in the department of Chemistry at Wayne State University from 2011 to 2015 and was tenured in the department of Chemistry and Biochemistry at the University of South Carolina in 2017. Hashemi continues to run her lab at the University of South Carolina and holds a senior lecturer position in the Department of Bioengineering at Imperial College London since 2019.

Research
Hashemi has pioneered tools for measurements of serotonin in the brain, a neurotransmitter important in the pathology of depression. Her team is using these tools in a variety of models to better understand, diagnose and treat mental disorders, with a focus on depression.

Notable awards
2019 CAMS Fellow (Community for Analytical Measurement Science)
2018 Society for Electroanalytical Chemistry (SEAC) Royce W. Murray Award
2018 Society of Pittsburgh Chemists Pittcon Achievement Award
2018 USC Breakthrough Stars Award
2017 Midwestern Universities Analytical Chemistry Conference Young Investigator Travel Award
2017 International Society for Neurochemistry Brain in Flux Symposium Young Faculty Travel Award
2017 NSF CAREER Award
2015 Eli Lilly Young Investigator Award in Analytical Chemistry
2013 Masao Horiba Award for Analytical Chemistry

Notable papers

References

External links
 
Parastoo Hashemi- UofSC Chemistry and Biochemsitry
Parastoo Hashemi- Imperial College London Bioengineering

1980 births
Living people
Wayne State University faculty
Alumni of King's College London
Alumni of Imperial College London
University of South Carolina faculty
Serotonin
Neural engineering
British neurologists